Bernier Island is one of three islands that comprise the Bernier and Dorre Island Nature Reserve in the Shark Bay World Heritage area in Western Australia.

The island and the neighbouring Dorre Island were locations for a lock hospital in the early 1900s.

Geography 
It is located at the north-western corner of the World Heritage area, almost due west of Carnarvon, Western Australia. The  Koks Island is offshore from the lighthouse at its northern end.

Fauna 
The island is home to one of the few remaining colonies of the Banded Hare-wallaby (Lagostrophus fasciatus) and the endangered species of mouse Pseudomys fieldi, known as djoongari or the Shark Bay mouse, of which there is an estimated 5,000 to 9,000 individuals.

Use as a lock hospital (1908-1919) 
In 1908 the Western Australian government created lock hospitals on Bernier and Dorre Islands, in order to forcibly incarcerate Aboriginal people suspected of having venereal disease. Aboriginal men were mostly detained on Bernier; Aboriginal women and children, mostly on Dorre.

The facilities at the lock hospitals were inadequate, inmates had no contact with their families back home, and underwent experimental medical treatments. It is conservatively estimated that 200 people died on the two islands, with their remains left in unmarked areas. During the 2019 centenary commemoration, Regional Development Minister Alannah MacTiernan described the Bernier and Dorre lock hospital era as "a really horrific piece of Western Australian history".

Memorial 
In April 2019 the Lock Hospital Tragedy Memorial "Don't look at the Islands", was installed on the mainland at Carnarvon, near the place where Aboriginal detainees were taken by boat to Bernier and Dorre.

See also

 List of islands in Shark Bay

References

Nature reserves in Western Australia
Islands of Shark Bay